The FIA International Hill Climb Cup is an FIA-run motorsport competition held across World on public roads, created in 2014, resulting form the merge between FIA European Hill Climb Cup and FIA International Hill Climb Challenge

Unlike circuit racing, each driver competes alone, starting from a point at the base of a mountain and reaching a finish point near the summit. The FIA International Hill Climb Cup allows single-seater cars, open-cockpit sports prototypes, and touring cars with varying degrees of technical preparation.

Unlike the events of the FIA European Hill Climb Championship, for which the minimum course length must be 5 km, no minimum length is set for the roads used during the events of the International Hill Climb Cup.

Podiums

Winners

See also

 European Hill Climb Championship
 Hillclimbing
 Mont Ventoux Hill Climb

References

External links
  - website about Czech and European hill climbs
  - Most complete European Hill Climb Championship race results 1957-today by ing. Roman Krejčí

Hillclimbing series
Hill Climb Cup
Recurring sporting events established in 2014